Saving the Family Name is a 1916 American drama film directed by Lois Weber and Phillips Smalley and written by Lois Weber. The film stars Mary MacLaren, Gerard Alexander, Carl von Schiller, Jack Holt, Phillips Smalley, and Harry Depp. The film was released on September 11, 1916, by Bluebird Photoplays, Inc.

Plot

Cast          
Mary MacLaren as Estelle Ryan
Gerard Alexander as Mrs. Winthrop
Carl von Schiller as Wally Dreislin
Jack Holt as Jansen Winthrop
Phillips Smalley as Robert Winthrop
Harry Depp as Billie Schramm
Gail Hawksworth as Dancer (uncredited)

References

External links

1916 films
1910s English-language films
Silent American drama films
1916 drama films
Universal Pictures films
Films directed by Lois Weber
Films directed by Phillips Smalley
American silent feature films
American black-and-white films
1910s American films